This is a listing of the top attended stakes races for thoroughbred racing in North America by year.

The chart lists the paid attendance of the eight top average attended races including the Kentucky Derby on Saturday and its companion race the Kentucky Oaks on Friday at Churchill Downs in Louisville, Kentucky; the Preakness Stakes on Saturday and its companion race the George E. Mitchell Stakes on Friday at Pimlico Race Course in Baltimore, Maryland; the Belmont Stakes in Elmont, New York; the Travers Stakes in Saratoga Springs, New York and the Breeders' Cup Classic on Saturday and its companion race the Breeders' Cup Distaff on Friday those locations rotates annually.

Notes:
* – Indicates the largest crowd for that event.
** – In 2015, NYRA announced that all future Belmont Stakes' attendances would be limited to 90,000 due to overcrowding concerns at Belmont Park.
# – The Maryland Jockey Club banned the infield's BYOB policy beginning in 2009. There was a  significant decrease in attendance in 2009. 
+ – Attendance was limited by COVID-19 Restrictions.

Notes

References 

Horse racing-related lists